Będzieszyn may refer to the following places:
Będzieszyn, Greater Poland Voivodeship (west-central Poland)
Będzieszyn, Bytów County in Pomeranian Voivodeship (north Poland)
Będzieszyn, Gdańsk County in Pomeranian Voivodeship (north Poland)